Independiente Rugby Club is a Spanish amateur rugby union club based in the Cantabrian city of Santander. The club was established in 1971 and competes in División de Honor; the top Spanish league competition for rugby union clubs. Independiente plays its home matches at the Mies de Cozada, a multi-use stadium in San Román de la Llanilla. The team traditionally plays in green and white colours.

For several years, the club was known for sponsorship reasons as Bathco Independiente or Bathco, the latter of which is now the name of Club de Rugby Santander.

Club honours
Independiente is the most successful rugby club in Cantabria. The team has played a number of seasons in the División de Honor (1978––80, 2013–present), two seasons in División de Honor B (2003–04 and 2011–12), 25 seasons in Primera Nacional and 1 season in Segunda Nacional.

Spanish tournaments:
Copa del Rey:
 Runners-up: 2013–14
División de Honor B: 1 
 Champions: 2012-13 (group 1)
Primera Nacional: 6 
 Champions: 1980-81 (group VI), 1981-82 (group XII), 1998-99 (group A), 2000-01 (group A), 2002–03, 2010-11 (group B)
 Runners-up: 1999-2000 (group A), 2001–02 (group B), 2005-06 (group B), 2009-10 (group B)
Segunda Nacional: 1 
 Champions: 1982-83 (group X)

Cantabrian tournaments:
Regional League: 2 
 Champions: 1971-72, 1974–75

In 2012–13 season played in División de Honor B finishing in 1st position in Group A, qualifying for promotion playoffs. On 5 May 2013, Independiente won Alcobendas in the promotion playoffs achieving the promotion to División de Honor 2013–14 after a long spell in minor divisions.

Season by season

See also
 Rugby union in Spain

References

External links
 Independiente official website

Sports teams in Cantabria
Spanish rugby union teams
Rugby clubs established in 1971